The JStik is a microcontroller based on the  line of embedded Java processors.  It is novel in that it uses Java byte code as the native machine language.  This makes it very fast at executing Java code while still maintaining the benefits of programming in a high-level language like Java.

External links
Jstik - JStik Home
Systronix Inc. — Makers of the JStik system.
aJile Systems Inc. - Makers of the Silicon

Microcontrollers